Sukhteh Kola (also Romanized as Sūkhteh Kolā) is a village in Balatajan Rural District, in the Central District of Qaem Shahr County, Mazandaran Province, Iran. At the 2006 census, its population was 586, in 153 families.

References 

Populated places in Qaem Shahr County